Stefan Vukić (born 29 June 1995) is a Serbian football striker who plays for TSC Bačka Topola.

Professional career

Early career
A member of Radnički Niš youth academy until 2014. After two loans at Sinđelić Niš and Car Konstantin, FK Radnički Niš decided to sale him to OFK Odžaci and many struggling years come for him in lower divisions of Serbia.

Zlatibor Čajetina
On January 14, 2020, with his market value at 150 thousand euros and a good performance at Budućnost Dobanovci with 3 goals in 19 appearances Zlatibor Čajetina decided to take his signature for two years. After six months in Serbian First League his club won the title and the promotion to the first division of Serbia scoring three goals in seven matches. In the season 2020–21 Serbian SuperLiga his 9 goals in 30 appearances weren't enough for his club to stay in the division but his performance distract big clubs of Serbia and other Countries.

Honours

Club
Zlatibor Čajetina
 Serbian First League: 2019–20

References

External links
 

1995 births
Living people
Sportspeople from Niš
Association football forwards
Serbian footballers
FK Radnički Niš players
FK Car Konstantin players
FK Budućnost Dobanovci players
FK Zlatibor Čajetina players
FK TSC Bačka Topola players
Serbian First League players
Serbian SuperLiga players